Night on the Sun is an EP by alternative rock band Modest Mouse, released in 1999 as a Japan-only album, again in 2000 as a 12" vinyl in the US and UK , and was re-issued in 2016 . The tracks on the Japan's Rebel Beat Factory label were taken from The Moon & Antarctica demos that were sent to Epic Records. The four tracks on 12" ended up on 2001's Everywhere and His Nasty Parlour Tricks. Extra percussion on I Came As A Rat (Long Walk Off A Short Dock) was provided by Ben Massarella and bass on You're the Good Things was played by Ben Blankenship .

Reception
Pitchfork Media compared the EP favorably to the works of The Velvet Underground, noting that the recording contained both characteristics of their earlier work as well as the musical direction taken after their major-label debut album, The Moon & Antarctica

Track listing

CD Release

"Night on the Sun" – 9:21
"You're the Good Things (It's Alright to Die)" – 4:23
"Wild Packs of Family Dogs" – 1:47
"Dark Center of the Universe" – 4:19
"Your Life" – 3:21
"No Title" (Jeremiah Green speaking Japanese) – 0:18

Vinyl Release

"Willful Suspension of Disbelief" – 3:33
"Night on the Sun" – 7:36
"I Came as a Rat (Long Walk Off a Short Dock)" – 4:36
"You're the Good Things" – 3:32

References

Modest Mouse albums
1999 EPs